Count Lőrinc Ágoston Gyula Szapáry de Szapár, Muraszombat et Széchy-Sziget (10 July 1866 – 13 July 1919) was a Hungarian diplomat, who served as Austro-Hungarian Ambassador to Chile from 1912 to 1916. The legation in Santiago was established in 1902. The envoy was also accredited to La Paz, Bolivia, and Lima, Peru. He retired in 1918.

He was the second son of former Prime Minister Count Gyula Szapáry and Countess Karolina Festetics.

External links
Lőrinc Szapáry genealogy

1866 births
1919 deaths
Nobility from Budapest
Diplomats from Budapest
Lorinc
Hungarian expatriates in Chile
Children of prime ministers of Hungary